Prelude to the Millennium: Essentials of Symphony is a compilation album by progressive metal band Symphony X, released in 1999. It features selections from their first four studio albums, although no original versions from their debut album Symphony X are included. Instead, the album starts with a fully re-recorded version of "Masquerade" that features Russell Allen on vocals.

Track listing
"Masquerade '98"  – 6:02 - original version from Symphony X
"A Winter's Dream" - Prelude (Part I)  – 3:03 - from The Damnation Game
"The Damnation Game"  – 4:32 - from The Damnation Game
"Dressed to Kill"  – 4:44 - from The Damnation Game
"Of Sins and Shadows"  – 4:56 - from The Divine Wings of Tragedy
"Sea of Lies"  – 4:18 - from The Divine Wings of Tragedy
"Out of the Ashes"  – 3:39 - from The Divine Wings of Tragedy
"The Divine Wings of Tragedy"  – 20:41 - from The Divine Wings of Tragedy
"Candlelight Fantasia"  – 6:42 - from The Divine Wings of Tragedy
"Smoke and Mirrors"  – 6:12 - from Twilight in Olympus
"Through the Looking Glass (Part I, II, III)"  – 13:04 - from Twilight in Olympus

Personnel
Russell Allen - vocals
Michael Romeo - guitars
Michael Pinnella - keyboards
Thomas Miller - bass
Jason Rullo - drums (tracks 1-9)
Tom Walling - drums (tracks 10, 11)

Symphony X albums
Albums produced by Steve Evetts
1998 compilation albums
Inside Out Music compilation albums